Eva Stort  (1855-1936) was a German painter.

Biography
Stort was born on 1 February 1855 in Berlin, Germany. She studied at the Kunstgewerbemuseum Berlin. Her teachers included Karl Stauffer-Bern and Max Liebermann. She was a member of Verein der Berliner Künstlerinnen (Association of Women Artists in Berlin). Her work was included in the exhibitions of the Berlin Secession.

She died on 31 January 1936 in Berlin. Her work is in the collection of the Staatsgalerie Stuttgart.

Gallery

References

External links

1855 births
1936 deaths
Artists from Berlin
20th-century German women artists
19th-century German women artists